The 2011 Open EuroEnergie de Quimper was a professional tennis tournament played on indoor hard courts. It was part of the 2011 ATP Challenger Tour. It took place in Quimper, France between 7 and 13 February 2011.

ATP entrants

Seeds

 Rankings are as of January 31, 2011.

Other entrants
The following players received wildcards into the singles main draw:
  Charles-Antoine Brézac
  Jonathan Eysseric
  Nicolas Mahut
  Ludovic Walter

The following players received entry from the qualifying draw:
  Kenny de Schepper
  Nicolas Renavand
  Mathieu Rodrigues
  Maxime Teixeira

Champions

Singles

 David Guez def.  Kenny de Schepper, 6–2, 4–6, 7–6(7–5)

Doubles

 James Cerretani /  Adil Shamasdin def.  Jamie Delgado /  Jonathan Marray, 6–3, 5–7, [10–5]

External links

2011 ATP Challenger Tour
2011
2011 in French tennis